Yulian Georgiev Manev (Bulgarian: Юлиян Георгиев Манев) (born 13 March 1966) is a Bulgarian former footballer who played as a forward. Manev was a prominent member of the Olympik Teteven team during their only season in the A PFG.

References

1966 births
Living people
People from Teteven
Bulgarian footballers
First Professional Football League (Bulgaria) players
Second Professional Football League (Bulgaria) players
PFC Vidima-Rakovski Sevlievo players
FC Botev Vratsa players
Association football forwards